is an athletic stadium in Muroran, Hokkaido, Japan. It is mainly used for track and field competitions, and is also used for football games.

From 1998, it was the main stadium for the J. League football team Consadole Sapporo in early spring and late autumn months, before the Sapporo Dome opened; and after that, until 2011, they played every year, one J. League game at this stadium.

External links
  

Football venues in Japan
Athletics (track and field) venues in Japan
Sports venues in Hokkaido
Muroran, Hokkaido
Sports venues completed in 1988
1988 establishments in Japan